China Hongqiao Group Limited is a company founded in 1994 that specializes in the production of aluminium. Hongqiao is currently the second largest aluminium producer in the world after Chinalco. It is listed on the Hong Kong Stock Exchange with stock code 1378, and is incorporated in George Town, Cayman Islands.

Its main production activities are headquartered in the Chinese Province of Shandong plus a new development in Yunnan Province.

The company's founder and former chairman, Zhang Shiping, was ranked 27th on the 2017 Forbes China Rich List with a net worth of $4.8 billion. His son, Zhang Bo, is the current chairman and chief executive officer of China Hongqiao.

From a family base of textile production, expansion into aluminium commenced in 2001 and the Group now has 6.46 million tonnes of licensed primary aluminium capacity, around 16 million tonnes of alumina capacity and is growing its newly established aluminium recycling business, along with downstream aluminium processing and lightweight innovation projects.

The company owns subsidiaries, including Shandong Weiqiao Aluminium Power Co., Ltd., Huimin Huihong New Aluminium Profiles Co., Ltd. and Hongqiao Investment (Hong Kong) Limited.

History  
The company's predecessor Shandong Hongqiao was founded in 1994 to produce and distribute jeans and yarn-dyed denim. Shandong Hongqiao was later renamed China Hongqiao Group. The company acquired a thermal energy provider aluminium & Power in June 2006, and reoriented to aluminium production a few months later.

The company's annual production capacity reached 301,513 tonnes of aluminium in 2007.

In 2011, Hongqiao was listed on the Hong Kong stock exchange at a price of $7.20 per share. The goal was to raise $2.2 billion of new capital. In the meantime, the company's annual production capacity reached 1.1 million tonnes per year which reached up to 4 million tonnes in 2014.

In March 2016, Hongqiao reached 5.2 million tonnes.

In 2018 China Hongqiao further increased its investment in environmental protection by with upgrading and renovating its electrolytic aluminium and alumina production process.

In 2020 the Group's hit net profit record of 8.14 billion yuan for the first half of the year.

In 2021 China Hongqiao's net profit increased by over 50%. Total profit reached 30.453 billion yuan, an increase of 57.3% over the same period in 2021. Its aluminium output reached 5.633 million tons

Sustainability
Over the years, China Hongqiao group has integrated sustainability, energy conservation and Green production into its overall strategy.

In 2019 Hongqiao announced its plan to move around 2 million tonnes of its annual capacity from Shandong in eastern China to Yunnan to allow easier access to a cleaner power source than coal for the energy-intensive aluminium smelting process.

Hongqiao's relocation of aluminium smelting capacity to Yunnan province is also part of China's bid to begin cutting back on carbon emissions by the end of the decade.

In 2020 China Hongqiao partnered with German-based Scholz Recycling Group to establish a recycling JV with focus on end-of-life vehicle recycling technologies and processing.

In 2021 China Hongqiao Group Co., Ltd. joined The Aluminium Stewardship Initiative as new Production and Transformation member.

In late June 2022, during the third Qingdao Multinationals Summit. China Hongqiao Group announced its climate goals to reach net-zero emissions before 2055 with the short-term goal to peak carbon emissions before 2025

Main Products 
China Hongqiao is the world's largest aluminium producer and has a diversified product portfolio. The production mainly covers the following areas: bauxite, alumina, primary aluminium, aluminium deep processing and energy.

Bauxite 
With more than 40 million annual inputs, China Hongqiao is the world's largest single bauxite importer. In Guinea, China Hongqiao set up a joint-venture mining company and a river port company, concentrating primarily on bauxite mining. The company built an industrial chain with the construction of a river port wharf and sea transfer system.

Alumina
In its alumina production, China Hongqiao utilizes the Bayer process, which involves six main production processes: processing of raw materials, dissolution, sedimentation, decomposition, evaporation and roasting.

Primary Aluminium 
In its primary production of aluminium, China Hongqiao utilized prebaked anode cells, the strength of which exceeds 400kA. In December 2014, the world's first extra-large pre-baked anode cell with a current strength of 600kA was placed into service.

Energy 
The ultra-low emission level has been achieved in China Hongqiao's thermoelectricity production process. Hongqiao Group has been transitioning to a more sustainable energy system, depending increasingly on hydropower and solar energy.

Lightweight
China Hongqiao has established a lightweight testing base in Shandong's province to create a production base for lightweight automobile parts and high-end uses of aluminium.
According to the company's 2021 report, the lightweight base has been completed and put into production.

Company operations

China: Shandong 
The Group's main production facilities in China are located in Binzhou, Shandong province.

The Group further extended its international cooperation and improved the development of a circular economy by joining hands with Germany's Scholz China GmbH to build the Sino-German Hongqiao Scholz Circular Economy Science & Technology Project, which focuses on secondary aluminium, scrapped vehicle and research and development of recycling technology, and practically contributes to the circular economy.

China: Yunnan 
In 2019 China Hongqiao announced its plan to move its smelting capacity to Yunnan Province in South China, rich in hydropower, to swap coal for cleaner hydropower

In September 2020, after starting construction of the new plant in December 2019, China Hongqiao initiated the first phase of greener production in Wenshan prefecture, Yunnan Province

After having to postpone the move because of power in mid 2021, China Hongqiao moved 2 million tons -60% of its 6.46 million licensed capacity- from Shandong province to Yunnan by the end of 2021.

Once Yunnan project reaches full production, it will have more than 31.4% renewable power aluminium capacity. Leveraging Yunnan's low hydro power tariff, we think CHQ's overall electricity costs advantages can be enhanced.

According to a company's report in 2021, the Group accelerated construction of the Yunnan green aluminium innovation industrial park initiating partial production in September 2020, which will help the Group effectively reduce its carbon emission and create a more eco-friendly production environment through more use of hydropower clean energy.

Indonesia 
In 2013, China Hongqiao Group and Indonesia's Khaleda Group, Weili Investment (Hong Kong) Co., Ltd. jointly established Hongfa Weili Alumina Co., Ltd with a joint investment of 1 billion U.S. dollars to build an annual output of 2 million tons of aluminium production in Indonesia's West Kalimantan Province.  As part of a joint venture with PT Well Harvest Winning Alumina Refinery, China Hongqiao Group announced in December 2012 an investment of $1.5 billion for the creation of a company mining aluminium bauxite at Borneo with an expected annual production capacity of 2 million tonnes.

In 2016, the company opened its first production facility in Indonesia with an output of 1 million tons per year. Hongqiao is the majority shareholder with a stake of 56% in PT Well Harvest Alumina. This was both the first Chinese investment in an alumina refining plant and the first aluminium factory built in Indonesia. Consisting of a power plant and a seaport in Ktapang in the Kalimantan region, the factory converts bauxite into alumina. Sun Xiushun, president of the shipping company Winning International Group and shareholder of the joint venture, explained that the treated alumina would mainly be used to meet the demand for raw materials from local Indonesian aluminium huts. The remaining aluminium oxide is primarily exported to China, the Middle East and other regions.

In December 2021, the third production line of the second phase of the project was successfully put into production

Guinea 
In June 2014, China Hongqiao Group Logistics Company Ltd. announced that it had signed a $120 million declaration of intent to acquire an unspecified company in the construction industry in Guinea. China Hongqiao Group, in conjunction with China Yantai Port Group, Singapore Weili Group and Guinea UMS Company, formed the winning alliance SMB WINNING CONSORTIUM, registered in Guinea to set up a joint development with a local company primarily engaged in bauxite mining with a $200 million investment in the first phase of the project. The main focus of the China Hongqiao Group was access to new bauxite reserves to meet growing demand in China. In March 2015, the company confirmed that it had reached an agreement on various mining and port investments of US$120 million to promote the development and export of bauxite.

According to Hongqiao chief executive officer Bo Zhang, further investments worth US$200 million would be flowing as part of a new consortium with the port of Yantai and the bauxite mine in Boke, thereby boosting 10 million tons of bauxite to the year 2017.

In November 2015, 170 000 tonnes of bauxite were shipped from Yantai to China. In March 2016, China Hongqiao Group announced that it would export approximately 15 million tons of bauxite for 2016 as a whole. For the year 2017, 30 million tons are targeted.

In 2020, China Hongqiao Group, as part of the consortium that includes, among others, Societe Miniere de Boké, Yantai Port Group Co. Ltd. Won the bid to develop a US$14 billion Simandou iron ore mine.

Criticism

Overcapacities 
Despite the efforts of the Chinese government to reduce the production surplus in the domestic bauxite industry through reforms, Hongqiao announced in March that production would be increased by 16% to 6 million tonnes by the end of 2016. According to Peter Thomas, vice president of Zaner Group LLC, a metal broker based in Chicago, this will lead to a 1% to 2% drop in aluminium prices.

The overcapacity in the Chinese industry results from intended government policies, such as cheap loans and government subsidies that were meant to reduce the production costs of companies. In the case of Hongqiao, the company's growth can be explained by the inclusion of loans worth more than US$2.1 billion in 2015.

In August 2016, Hongqiao chief executive officer Zhang Bo dismissed fears of overcapacity in the aluminium industry, emphasizing instead the industry's stability.

Since its stock market listing in 2011, the company has experienced record growth. The production capacity of 1.1 million tonnes has been increased to 5.2 million tonnes since the IPO (March 2016).

In August 2017, the company announced a cut of 2 million tonnes of outdated aluminium production capacity, amid a renewed governmental crackdown on illegal production.

Environmental issues 
The production of aluminium is very energy intensive. Accordingly, Hongqiao's aluminium factories are heavily dependent on coal-generated electricity. Due to the high energy consumption, Hongqiao's Chinese production plants cause CO2 emissions of more than 100,000 kt per year. In 2012, Chinese journalists reported about the deteriorating living conditions of people near the factories. The main reasons were air and water pollution. That same year, the company announced it would use coal ash for aluminium production, however, satellite images of the factory in Shandong showed large amounts of red mud, a toxic waste product of the bauxite production process. Since the production of aluminium from coal ash is very expensive, the company opted instead for bauxite. Toxic waste was then stored in the vicinity of agricultural areas, which led to fears that alkaline substances such as iron oxide, silicon oxide and titanium oxide could be released into the atmosphere.

In 2016, Hongqiao was charged with operating unlicensed mills with a capacity of 2,000kt, as well as environmental fraud by ignoring Chinese emissions standards.

After the Chinese Communist Party passed stricter environmental requirements, Hongqiao began to make the transition to renewable energies and stopped operating the smallest and most polluting electricity works.

In October 2016, the South China Morning Post reported that Hongqiao's aluminium smelter capacity in Binzhou was threatened after the city ordered a production stop of the local production lines with an annual total capacity of 3.61 million tonnes. In addition to financial penalties, the company must also expect the closure of other sites because of "disregard for environmental protection permits before construction and operation of the plants". At the same time, the construction of an aluminium hut with an annual production capacity of 1.32 million tonnes was stopped because no environmental impact assessment was carried out again. Hongqiao did not publish an official press release, but stated that the accusations of the government were understood and noted.

Power generation 
China Hongqiao Group was one of the first companies to adopt the so-called "Weiqiao model" in which aluminium plants are supported by self-built, coal-fueled power plants, which often do not meet the environmental requirements. This organizational model is now widely used in the Chinese aluminium industry.

CCP media outlets reported in 2012 that the company was infringing on the legal regulations regarding electricity generation by producing cheap electricity independent of the national electricity grid. The State Commission for Development and Reform indicated that the electricity produced by Hongqiao contributes significantly to air pollution, since the environmental protection equipment of the factories was removed in order to reduce production costs. Hongqiao denied the repeated reproaches of the government. In 2015, the company switched off their smaller electricity plants to demonstrate its commitment to clean aluminium production.

Anonymous report 
In November 2016, an anonymous short-seller published a report accusing Hongqiao of having accumulated a debt of 67.7 billion RMB and having disguised this through unusually high profit margins, thereby deliberately obscuring the true profitability of the enterprise.

A further report from Emerson Analytics, which seemingly confirmed the allegations, prompted the company to suspend its stock trading on 1 March 2017 after Hongqiao's stock value had fallen by 8.3% within 30 minutes. On March 21, Hongqiao announced a "possible delay" in the publication of its annual results and annual report for the year ended December 31, 2016 due to disagreements raised by auditor Ernst & Young. The following day, China Hongqiao shares were stopped again. The continued delay in the publication of company results, as well as accounting irregularities, led to a credit downgrade in July 2017.

References 

Companies based in Henan
Chinese companies established in 1994
Aluminium companies of China
Chinese brands
Zouping